Colonial or The Colonial may refer to:
 Colonial, of, relating to, or characteristic of a colony or colony (biology)

Architecture
 American colonial architecture
 French Colonial
 Spanish Colonial architecture

Automobiles
 Colonial (1920 automobile), the first American automobile with four-wheel brakes
 Colonial (Shaw automobile), a rebranded Shaw sold from 1921 until 1922
 Colonial (1921 automobile), a car from Boston which was sold from 1921 until 1922

Commerce
 Colonial Pipeline, the largest oil pipeline network in the U.S.
 Inmobiliaria Colonial, a Spanish corporation, which includes companies in the domains of real estate

Places
 The Colonial (Indianapolis, Indiana)
 The Colonial (Mansfield, Ohio), a National Register of Historic Places listing in Richland County, Ohio
 Ciudad Colonial (Santo Domingo), a historic central neighborhood of Santo Domingo
 Colonial Country Club (Memphis), a golf course in Tennessee
 Colonial Country Club (Fort Worth), a golf course in Texas
 Fort Worth Invitational or The Colonial, a PGA golf tournament

Trains
 Colonial (PRR train), a Pennsylvania Railroad run between Washington, DC and New York City, last operated in 1973 by Amtrak
 Colonial (Amtrak train), an Amtrak train that ran between Newport News, Virginia and Boston from 1976 to 1992, and between Richmond, Virginia and New York City from 1997 to 1999

See also
 Colonial history of the United States, the period of American history from the 17th century to 1776,  under the rule of Great Britain, France and Spain
 Colonial Hotel (disambiguation)
 Colonial Revival architecture
 Colonial Theatre (disambiguation)
 Colonial troops, any of various military units recruited from, or used as garrison troops in, colonial territories
 Colonialism, the extension of political control to new areas
 Colonials (disambiguation)
 Colonist, a person who has migrated to an area and established a permanent residence there to colonize the area
 History of Australia
 Spanish colonization of the Americas, the period of history of Spanish rule over most of the Americas, from the 15th century through the late 19th century